Rodolfo Neri Vela (born 19 February 1952) is a Mexican scientist and astronaut who flew aboard a NASA Space Shuttle mission in the year 1985. He is the second Latin American to have traveled to space.

Personal
Neri was born in Chilpancingo, Guerrero, Mexico. He is a professor for the Telecommunications Department in the Electrical Engineering Division of the Engineering Faculty, at the National Autonomous University of Mexico (UNAM). He is of Native American, Spanish and Italian ancestry.

Education
Neri was a High School student at Escuela Nacional Preparatoria 2. Neri received a bachelor's degree in mechanical and electrical engineering, National Autonomous University of Mexico (UNAM) 1975, and received a master's degree in science, specialized in telecommunications systems, in 1976 from the University of Essex, England. Neri then received a doctorate degree in electromagnetic radiation from the University of Birmingham in 1979 and performed one year of postdoctoral research in waveguides at the University of Birmingham.

Career
The Institute of Electrical and Electronics Engineers, United States; The Institution of Electrical Engineers, UK; Asociación Mexicana de Ingenieros en Comunicaciones Eléctricas y Electrónicas, Mexico; and Colegio de Ingenieros Mecánicos y Electricistas, Mexico.

Neri has worked as an Institute of Electrical Research, Mexico, in the Radio communications Group, doing research and system planning on antenna theory and design, satellite communications systems, and Earth station technology.

He is currently also a full-time researcher at the Electric Engineering department of the Faculty of Engineering at UNAM.

In 2016, he had a participation in the Latin American dubbing of the film Finding Dory as the narrator of the recording of the Institute of Marine Life.

Spaceflight

Neri was a Payload Specialist aboard the STS-61-B Atlantis mission, from (November 26 to December 3, 1985). STS-61B launched at night from Kennedy Space Center, Florida, and returned to land at Edwards Air Force Base, California. During the mission the crew deployed the MORELOS-B, AUSSATT II, and SATCOM K-2 communications satellites, conducted two six-hour spacewalks to demonstrate space station construction techniques with the EASE/ACCESS experiments, operated the Continuous Flow Electrophoresis (CRFES) experiment for McDonnell Douglas and a Getaway Special (GAS) container for Telesat, Canada, conducted several Mexican Payload Specialists Experiments for the Mexican government, and tested the Orbiter Experiments Digital Autopilot (OEX DAP).

At mission conclusion, Neri had traveled 2.4 million miles (3.8 million km) in 108 Earth orbits, and logged over 165 hours in space.

See also
 List of Hispanic astronauts

Bibliography

References

External links
Official web page
Interview with Rodolfo Neri Vela for Mexican TV (Spanish)
NASA biography page (original source for this article)
Rodolfo Neri Vela, International Space Hall of Fame inductee
Spacefacts biography of Rodolfo Neri Vela
"Accidente 'echó abajo' al segundo astronauta nacional" 2005-11-25 article in El Universal newspaper; *English translation

Mexican astronauts
Mexican telecommunications engineers
1952 births
People from Chilpancingo
Mexican people of Italian descent
Mexican people of Spanish descent
Alumni of the University of Birmingham
National Autonomous University of Mexico alumni
Alumni of the University of Essex
Living people
Space Shuttle program astronauts